La Mine d'or de Dick Digger, written and drawn by Morris, is an album containing two stories from serial publication in Le Journal de Spirou during 1947, namely La Mine d'or de Dick Digger and Le Sosie de Lucky Luke. Together they were released as the first official Lucky Luke hardcover album in 1949 and in English by Cinebook in 2014 as Dick Digger's Gold Mine.

Stories

La Mine d'or de Dick Digger

Synopsis 
Lucky Luke and Jolly Jumper meet an old friend, the prospector Dick Digger in ecstasy over a recent gold ore discovery in the West Hills, en route to register his gold mine claim in Nugget City. He has hidden his map in a bottle of rum. Celebrating loudly at a saloon, Digger is identified as a target of robbery by two hardened criminals. During the night while sleeping in a room above a saloon, he has his gold and his plan stolen by two bandits. He tries to defend himself but he gets a bad blow on the head and loses his memory. The following day, Lucky Luke and Jolly Jumper take up pursuit following their trail. Luke finds the bandits' trail and manages to steal the bottle containing the plan. The bandits launch themselves on its track and, after a mad chase, take again the bottle. But Lucky Luke played a trick on them: he drew a false map that sent the desperados in a trap. He and the Nugget City Sheriff capture the bandits. Dick Digger recovers his memory during a face-to-face meeting with the band leader and goes off with his family to dig for the gold.

Characters 

 Dick Digger: A gold digger, and Lucky Luke's friend, he finds a gold vein in the West Hills. He hides the map showing the location of the mine in a bottle of rum.
 Big Belly: Bandit. He steals the gold and the plan of the Dick Digger gold mine. He previously appeared in Arizona 1880.
 Mestizo: Mexican accomplice of Big Belly.

Le Sosie de Lucky Luke

Synopsis 
Luke discovers he causes fear in the inhabitants of a town, because he is remarkably similar to a notorious felon named Mad Jim, currently in prison and scheduled for hanging. Spotted by two thugs, Luke is ambushed and knocked out, with the thugs replacing him with the doppelgänger in a drunken sheriff's jail cell, in order to get a share of Mad Jim's loot. Lucky Luke, awake, tries to persuade the sheriff's sheriff that he is not Mad Jim but it is a waste of time. Fortunately, the executor fails when he has to hang him and Lucky Luke just manages to escape. He gets on the trail of Mad Jim and his accomplices, Stan Strangler and Charley Chick. He succeeds quite easily in capturing them but they manage to escape thanks to two Indians who do not like Lucky Luke's present (a harmonica) and make him prisoner. Fortunately, Lucky Luke escapes following an argument between the two acolytes. He manages to capture the three bandits again and brings them back to Silverbrook. Again, Mad Jim manages to escape. The final confrontation between him and Lucky Luke takes place at the local saloon. This confrontation ends in the death of Mad Jim, who is therefore one of the rare people that Luke kills during a duel. In the following albums, he never again kills a single man during a duel, contenting himself with disarming his adversaries using his colt or by putting them in a state of harm in another way.

Characters 

 Mad Jim: Bandit, Lucky Luke's lookalike.
 Stan Strangler: Accomplice of Mad Jim.
 Charley Chick: Accomplice of Mad Jim, has a wooden leg.

Background
 Among the very earliest Lucky Luke works (produced the following year after the first story, Arizona 1880). La Mine d'or de Dick Digger and Le Sosie de Lucky Luke were published before Morris began his five-year stay in U.S.A. The artwork of the two stories (which shows obvious differences although created only months apart) demonstrates the changes from the earliest style to what would become the settled Lucky Luke expression. At this point the Jolly Jumper character had not yet been given the power of speech.
 The end of Le Sosie de Lucky Luke marks one of the very few times Lucky Luke kills the villain. The final duel of Lucky Luke contre Phil Defer originally ended with the death of the latter. In the censored version, the doctor then declares him simply injured but his shoulder in such a state that his career as a gunman is over. Bob Dalton (cousin of the less fierce Daltons) also met a violent end in the story Hors-la-loi, though after the original Spirou publication this was judged to be too bloody by the commission de surveillance des publications destinées aux jeunes, a state organisation created in 1949, and softened for the album reissue, with the Daltons simply being hanged and buried. Joe refers to the incident in Belle Star, saying that Luke hasn't shot anyone since his double, "forty-five years ago!"
 These stories also feature caricatures of people from Morris' circle, notably André Franquin, Will, and the fathers of Morris and Eddy Paape.
 Lucky Luke doesn't smoke cigarettes in these stories. He started smoking in the next album, Rodéo.

Sources

 Morris publications in Spirou BDoubliées 

Footnotes

External links
 Lucky Luke official site 

Comics by Morris (cartoonist)
Lucky Luke albums
1949 graphic novels
Works originally published in Spirou (magazine)
Literature first published in serial form